This is a list of Baloch tribes and clans. 

The Baloch are an Iranian people of the Western Iranian group and Northwestern subgroup that mainly lives in three countries: Pakistan, Iran and Afghanistan. More specifically they live in Southwestern Pakistan (most in the province of Balochistan, but also in Sindh), Southeastern Iran (most in the province of Sistan and Balochistan, but also in eastern Hormozgan and eastern areas of South Khorasan and Razavi Khorasan provinces) and Far Southern Afghanistan (most in the southern areas of the provinces of Nimruz, Helmand and Kandahar, but also in the western areas of Farah and Herat provinces). 
There are also scattered and significant Baloch communities in other countries like Turkmenistan. There is a Baloch diaspora in India, Oman Saudi Arabia and United Arab Emirates (UAE).

A
Askani

B
Bajkani
Bangulzai
Baranzai
Barazani
Bhurgari
Bhagnari
Bugti
Buzdar
Buledi
Burfat
Bahawalanzai 
Bijarani Buledi
Bijarani

C
Chandio
Chhutta
Chhalgari

D
Darzada
Dehwar
Dodai
Damani

G
Gabol
Gurchani
Gurmani
Ghazini

H
Habjana

J
Jarwar
Jat(Jutt)
Jatoi
Jalbani

K
Kalmati
Kandani
Khetran
Kulachi
Khushk

L
Lanjwani
Langove/Langove/Langah
Lashar/Lashari
Lashkrani
Leghari
Lund
Loharani

M
Magsi
Maretha
Marri
Mazari
Med
Mirali
Mollazehi
Mugheri
Mullazai
Mengal
Muhammad Shahi

N
Nothazai
Noohani

P
Pitafi

Q
Qaisrani

R
Rakhshani
Rind

S
Sanjrani
Sethwi
Shaikhzadah
Sarmastani
Sanghur
Shambhani
Shirani

T
Talpur
Tauki

U
Umrani
Umarzai

W
Wahocha

Y
Yarahmadzai

Z
Zardari

Baloch tribes in Diaspora

Baluch (Rajasthan) (India)
Baluch (Uttar Pradesh) (India)
Jats of Kutch (in Gujarat, India)
Makrani caste (in Gujarat, India)

See also 
Baloch people
Iranian peoples
List of ancient Iranian peoples
Tribe
Clan

References 

Jānmahmad. (1982). The Baloch cultural heritage. Royal Book Co.

Baloch
Baloch tribes